Carl William Thompson (March 15, 1914September 19, 2002) was an American lawyer and Democratic politician.  He served 26 years in the Wisconsin State Senate and six years in the State Assembly, representing Dane County.  He was an unsuccessful candidate for Governor of Wisconsin in 1948 and 1950.

Biography
Carl William Thompson was born on March 15, 1914, in Washington, D.C., to Carl W. Thompson, Sr., and Hannah Hegge Thompson. He graduated from high school in Stoughton, Wisconsin, before graduating from the University of Wisconsin-Madison and the University of Wisconsin Law School. During World War II, he served in the United States Army. Thompson died on September 19, 2002, in Stoughton. He was married with four children.

Political career
Thompson was a presidential elector for the 1948 presidential election. From 1949 to 1956, he was a member of the Democratic National Committee. In 1947, he was a candidate in for the United States House of Representatives from Wisconsin's 2nd congressional district in the special election following the death of Robert Kirkland Henry. He lost to Glenn Robert Davis. Thompson was twice an unsuccessful candidate for Governor of Wisconsin, losing to incumbent Oscar Rennebohm in 1948 and to Walter J. Kohler, Jr., in 1950, and was a delegate to the Democratic National Convention in 1952 and 1956. After serving as an alderman and city attorney in Stoughton, he was a member of the Assembly from 1953 until 1959, when he was elected to the Senate in a special election. He remained in the Senate until 1984.

References

External links

See also
The Political Graveyard

|-

People from Washington, D.C.
People from Stoughton, Wisconsin
Democratic Party Wisconsin state senators
Democratic Party members of the Wisconsin State Assembly
Wisconsin lawyers
Military personnel from Wisconsin
United States Army personnel of World War II
University of Wisconsin–Madison alumni
University of Wisconsin Law School alumni
1914 births
2002 deaths
20th-century American politicians
20th-century American lawyers